Polus of Aegina was a celebrated tragic actor, the son of Charicles of Sunium, and a disciple of Archias of Thurii.

It is related of him that at the age of 70, shortly before his death, he acted in eight tragedies on four successive days.

Notes

Ancient Greek actors
4th-century BC Greek people
Ancient Aeginetans